Willeke van der Weide (born 9 September 1965) is a Dutch road racing cyclist. 

Raised in Oudewater, she was known as a triathlete when she became national time trial champion in 1996.

References

External links

1965 births
Living people
Dutch cycling time trial champions
Dutch female cyclists
Dutch female triathletes
Place of birth missing (living people)
People from Oudewater
Cyclists from Utrecht (province)